Japanese singer Ayumi Hamasaki has released eighteen studio albums, five compilation albums, twenty-six remix albums, four live albums and numerous singles and promotional singles. She debuted in 1995 under Nippon Columbia with the stage name Ayumi, releasing an extended play Nothing from Nothing, which was a collaboration with Dohzi-T and DJ Bass. Three years later, Hamasaki debuted again as a singer under Avex Trax with the single "Poker Face" (1998). Her first album A Song for ×× (1999) debuted at number one on Oricon's albums chart, and sold over 1.4 million copies.

Hamasaki is a prolifically remixed musician, having released 26 remix albums since her first in 1999, Ayu-mi-x. Several remix albums are released in series, such as Ayu-ro Mix, featuring Eurobeat remixes in collaboration with Super Eurobeat, and Ayu Trance in collaboration with Cyber Trance. She has also featured remix albums dedicated to acoustic and classical music, as well as non-stop remixes.

Albums

Studio albums

Compilation albums

Remix albums

Live albums

Box sets

Extended plays

Remix extended plays

Singles

As a lead artist

1990s

2000s

2010s

2020s

As a collaborating artist

Promotional singles

Other charted songs

Other appearances

Notes

References

Discographies of Japanese artists
Discography
Pop music discographies